Here Are the Aguilares! is a 1957 Mexican musical comedy Western film written and directed by Jaime Salvador, and starring Luis Aguilar, Antonio Aguilar, Rosa de Castilla and Lucy Gallardo. The film's sets were designed by art director Jesús Bracho. It is considered among Luis Aguilar's most famous works.

Plot
The Aguilar brothers, Luis and Antonio, arrive at the farm of Anita, the young rich widow of a colonel, whom both try to seduce, while also having to deal with a band of cattle rustlers.

Cast
Luis Aguilar as Luis
Antonio Aguilar as Antonio
Rosa de Castilla as Charito
Lucy Gallardo

Agustín Isunza
Julio Villarreal
Antonio Raxel
José Eduardo Pérez
Manuel Arvide
Francisco Meneses
José Luis Fernández
Guillermo Hernández (uncredited)
Ignacio Peón (uncredited)
Manuel Vergara (uncredited)

Production and release
Here Are the Aguilares! was filmed from February 1956 at the San Ángel studios. It was released in the Bucareli, Colonial, Popotla and Tacubaya cinemas for one week.

Reception
In his book El actor de cine: arte, mito y realidad, when resuming Luis Aguilar's career, José Alberto Lezcano considered it among Aguilar's most famous works, describing it as one of his "comedies of manners and rural melodramas."

Jaime Salvador's direction has been also singled out. In El cine mexicano, Emilio García Riera states that "what Jaime Salvador directs in this period, one can find everything," while the book El exilio español de 1939 recounts a number of films directed by Salvador during this period, including Here Are the Aguilares!, saying that during this period "Salvador continued to shoot, without inspiration, comedies, musical comedies, adventure films and melodramas."

References

External links

1957 musical comedy films
1957 films
1957 romantic comedy films
1950s Western (genre) comedy films
Films directed by Jaime Salvador
Mexican musical comedy films
Mexican romantic comedy films
Mexican Western (genre) comedy films
1950s Mexican films